West Hampstead was a football team that formerly played in the Southern Football League.

The first reference to the club was in 1893, and in 1897 they joined Division Two of the London League.

They were elected to Division Two of the Southern League for the 1901/02 season, winning six of their 16 league matches. They left the league at the end of the season.

In 1905/06 they reached the 4th Qualifying Round of the FA Cup, losing to Swindon Town.

References

Defunct football clubs in England
London League (football)
Southern Football League clubs
Defunct football clubs in London
Association football clubs established in the 19th century